The Carngham Linton Football Netball Club is an Australian rules football and netball club from Linton which competes in the Central Highlands Football League. 
They previously played in the Western Plains Football League and Lexton Plains Football League.

History of football in the district 
The first record of a football was in 1879 when newspaper reports for two matches between Carngham and Linton were played. Carngham won on both occasions.  For the next thirty years challenge matches were arranged between local clubs until a formal association was formed in 1909.

A football association was formed between the clubs of Skipton, Carngham, Linton and Scarsdale in 1909 that lasted until World War I. During the war there was no competition at all.

In 1919, the Linton & District Football Association was founded and Skipton, Carngham and Linton played in the competition and the Scarsdale club rejoined later. Over the years of competition in the LDFA, football fever was developing hatred and bitter rivalry between the local towns. Linton won LDFA premierships in 1920, 1922 and 1925.

The competition was renamed the Linton-Scarsdale Association in 1925, with the addition of teams from the towns of Lismore and Bradvale. The name was changed again in 1927, to the Linton-Skipton Association after Carngham and Scarsdale transferred to the Rokewood-Cape Clear Association. 

Linton joined the Rokewood-Cape Clear Association in 1930, which became the Cape Clear-Carngham Association from 1934, then the Linton-Carngham Association from 1936, with Skipton again ending the season runner up to Illabarook.

In 1937, Carngham lost to Skipton in a closely contested grand final but the tables were turned in 1938 when Carngham beat Skipton. Carngham again won in 1939. After 1940, the association went into recess due to World War II.

After football resumed in the area in 1946, the Linton-Carngham Association was dominated by Carngham who won six of seven premierships after the war. In 1953 the clubs in the Linton-Carngham Football League all rolled into the Western Plains Football League.

Linton stayed in the Western Plains Football League and won its final premiership and first for thirty-seven years in 1962. The club then struggled for success and players before going into recess during 1968. Carngham would transfer to the Ballarat Football League District section without success until merging with its neighbour at the 1968.

History of the club 
After many years of talking an agreement was reached to merge the two clubs in  1969. Carngham Linton Football Club first took the field in 1969 in the 
Western Plains Football League. Over the next thirty years the club won twelve premierships including four in a row from 1982 to 1985.
When the Western Plains merged with the Lexton FL. in 1999 the club won five of the 12 premiership of that league. In 2011 the league stopped operating so the club transferred to the Central Highlands Football League.

Leagues and Premierships
Western Plains Football League (1969–1998)
 1974, 1976, 1982, 1983, 1984, 1985, 1987, 1989, 1990, 1995, 1997, 1998
Lexton Plains Football League (1999–2010)
 2000, 2004, 2006, 2007, 2008
Central Highlands Football League (2011- )

Book
 History of Football in the Ballarat District by John Stoward -

References

External links
 
 Gameday website

Ballarat Football League clubs
1960s establishments in Australia